Xerocrassa grata is a species of air-breathing land snail, a pulmonate gastropod mollusk in the family Geomitridae.

Distribution

This species is endemic to the southern half of the province of Tarragona in Catalonia, Spain.

References

 Bank, R. A.; Neubert, E. (2017). Checklist of the land and freshwater Gastropoda of Europe. Last update: July 16th, 2017.

External links
 Haas, F. (1924). Beitrag zur Molluskenfauna des unteren Ebrogebietes. Archiv für Molluskenkunde. 56 (4): 137-160, pl. 8. Frankfurt am Main

grata
Molluscs of Europe
Endemic fauna of Spain
Gastropods described in 1924